Talisker distillery is an island single malt Scotch whisky distillery based in Carbost, Scotland on the Minginish Peninsula on the Isle of Skye. The distillery is operated by Diageo and Taliskers’ 10 year old whisky has been nominated as part of their Classic Malts series. The brand is considered a premium single malt Whisky.

In 1830 Hugh MacAskill leased the site from the MacLeods, having raised £3,000 and built the distillery. He chose to name it after his estate, Talisker, (some 5 miles west) rather than the village in which it was located.

History
After a number of false starts, the distillery was founded in 1830 by Hugh and Kenneth MacAskill. It opened at Carbost in 1831 after they acquired the lease of Talisker House from Clan MacLeod. In 1879, it was purchased for £1,810 by a firm which became known as R. Kemp & Co. when it had a production capacity of 700 gallons per week. The principal partner was A.G. Allan, Procurator-Fiscal for Elginshire. The other partner was Roderick Kemp, wine merchant of Elgin. 

The distillery was rebuilt 1880–87 and extended in 1900. A new lease for the distillery was negotiated in 1892 with the chief of Clan MacLeod ifor an annual payment of £23.12s and a ten-gallon cask of best-quality Talisker. By 1894 the output was up to 2,000 gallons per week. In 1895 the business was converted into a limited liability company with Thomas Mackenzie as managing partner, but the shares were not offered to the public.

Talisker was acquired by Distillers Company in 1925 and is now part of Diageo. 

On 12 August 1948 a fire broke out in the store of the distillery. No whisky was destroyed, but grain in store and over 100 empty barrels were lost.

The distillery was rebuilt again in 1960 after a stillhouse fire completely destroyed the distillery. The distillery operates five stills; two wash stills and three spirit stills. All the stills use worm tubs (condensing coils) rather than a modern condenser, which are believed to give the whisky a "fuller" flavour (itself an indication of higher sugar content). During this early period, the whisky was produced using a triple distilling method, but changed to the more conventional double distilling in 1928. After the 1960 fire, five exact replicas of the original stills were constructed to preserve the original Talisker flavour. In 1972 the stills were converted to steam heating and the maltings floor was demolished. Talisker's water comes from springs directly above the distillery via a network of pipes and wells.

The malted barley used in production comes from Muir of Ord. Talisker has an unusual feature—swan neck lye pipes. A loop in the pipes takes the vapour from the stills to the worm tubs, which causes some of the alcohol to condense before it reaches the cooler. It then runs back into the stills and is distilled again. Talisker now has an annual output of three and a half million litres of spirit.

Talisker was the favourite whisky of writers Robert Louis Stevenson and HV Morton. In his poem "The Scotsman's Return From Abroad", Stevenson mentioned "The king o' drinks, as I conceive it, Talisker, Islay, or Glenlivet."

In early 2020, Talisker came under scrutiny after a radiocarbon study suggested Talisker 1863 whisky was produced much later, either between 1957-58 or 2007-2014.

Character
The spirit is most frequently matured in American oak casks. The malt is peated to a phenol level of approximately 18–22 parts per million (ppm), which is a medium peating level. Additionally, the water used for production, from Cnoc nan Speireag (Hawk Hill), flows over peat which adds additional complexity to the whisky.

The distillery began producing special bottlings of the whisky for connoisseurs in the early 2000s, with a 20- and 25-year bottling (where previously only a 10-year and 18-year were available). The 25-year bottling, despite being more expensive than the 20-year bottling, was distributed more widely.

In 2007 Talisker 18-year-old won "Best Single Malt In The World 2007" at the World Whiskies Awards. and in 2015 Talisker 10 Year Old won a Double Gold Medal and "Best Single Malt Scotch up to 12 years" in the San Francisco World Spirits Competition.

Bottlings

 Talisker 10 Year Old
 Talisker Skye
 Talisker Storm
 Talisker Dark Storm
 Talisker 18 year Old (limited annual run)
 Talisker 25 year Old (limited annual run)
 Talisker 30 year Old (limited annual run)
 Talisker Distiller's edition 
 Talisker 57° North
 Talisker Port Ruighe
 Talisker Neist Point
 Talisker 8 Year Old Cask Strength (periodic release)

Reviews and accolades
Talisker whiskies have generally performed very well at international Spirit ratings competitions and have won some acclaim from liquor review organizations.  The 10-, 18-, 25- and 30-year Taliskers have been awarded mostly gold medals from the San Francisco World Spirits Competition.  The 10- and 18-year varieties, meanwhile, have received scores of 85-89 and 90-95 from Wine Enthusiast.  Spirits ratings aggregator proof66.com, which averages scores from the San Francisco World Spirits Competition, Wine Enthusiast, and others, classifies Talisker's 10-year scotch in its highest ("Tier 1") performance category.

Talisker Distiller's Edition won Best Islands Single Malt at the 2013 World Whiskies Awards.

References in popular culture
Talisker is repeatedly referenced in the BBC Radio 4 comedy Cabin Pressure. Three separate episodes ("Edinburgh" in series 1, "Paris" in series 3 and "Timbuktu" in series 4) revolve around First Officer Douglas Richardson's attempts to steal 25-year-old Talisker whisky rightfully belonging to the wealthy regular passenger Mr Birling, and it is also mentioned in several other episodes.

In the movie Charlie Wilson's War, CIA agent Gust Avrakotos presents US Rep. Wilson a bottle of Talisker. The agent explains to Charlie the scotch is mentioned in a Robert Louis Stevenson poem, "The Scotsman's Return From Abroad". The bottle is bugged and allows him to listen to the congressman's conversations.
Talisker is also referenced in John le Carré's A Legacy of Spies, as Alec Leamus' favorite.

In the 2017 movie CHiPs, Poncherello is sitting in his apartment after a long day and a disagreement with Baker and he is working on a bottle of 10 year old Talisker.

In the 2019 Amazon Prime / BBC co-production Good Omens, the demon Crowley (played by Scotsman David Tennant) drinks Talisker by the bottle as he awaits the coming apocalypse. Director Douglas Mackinnon is from the Isle of Skye and inserted references to his home area wherever he could.

In the series finale of the espionage drama Homeland, former CIA Director and National Security Advisor Saul Berenson is seen drinking Talisker while awaiting a fateful confrontation with his protégée.

Alfred (Bruce Wayne's butler) was pouring himself a dram of Talisker whisky in celebration of the revival of superman in Zack Snyder's Justice League, released on HBO Max in 2021.

See also

 List of whisky brands
 List of distilleries in Scotland

References

General
 
 
 
 
Talisker@Whiskypedia
CE 6.0 - why the codename "Yamazaki" ?, Mike Hall, Microsoft Development Network, 20 Sep 2006.

External links

 
 Dr. Whisky on Talisker
 Johannes van der Heuvel (Malt Madness/Malt Maniacs blog)  on Talisker
 thebar.com UK Diageo owned cocktail recipe site

Distilleries in Scotland
Scottish malt whisky
Scottish brands
Luxury brands
Isle of Skye
Diageo brands